Mohammad Nasrullah bin Abdul Aziz (born 17 December 1997) is a Malaysian footballer who plays as a goalkeeper.

References

External links 
 

Living people
People from Perak
1997 births
Malaysian footballers
Association football goalkeepers
Perak F.C. players
Malaysia Super League players